The 35th Directors Guild of America Awards, honoring the outstanding directorial achievements in film and television in 1982, were presented on March 12, 1983 at the Beverly Hilton and the Plaza Hotel. The feature film nominees were announced on January 30, 1983.

Winners and nominees

Film

Television

Commercials

D.W. Griffith Award
 John Huston

Frank Capra Achievement Award
 William Beaudine Jr.
 William C. Gerrity

Honorary Life Member
 Elia Kazan
 Robert Wise

References

External links
 

Directors Guild of America Awards
1982 film awards
1982 television awards
Direct
Direct
Directors
Directors Guild of America Awards
Directors Guild of America Awards
Directors Guild of America Awards